Wymysorys (or ), also known as Vilamovian or Wilamowicean, is a West Germanic language spoken by the ethnic Vilamovian minority in the small town of Wilamowice, Poland ( in Wymysorys), on the border between Silesia and Lesser Poland, near Bielsko-Biała. It is considered an endangered language, possibly the most so of any of the Germanic languages. There are probably fewer than 20 native users of Wymysorys, or around 70 speakers in 2006 according to Ethnologue, virtually all bilingual; the majority are elderly.

The status of Wymysorys is complex because genealogically, it belongs to the East Central dialect group of High German. Nevertheless, based on the self-identification of users as a group separate from the Germans and the existence of a literary language (or, more precisely, a microlanguage), it can be considered a separate language.

It belongs to the dialect group of the former , which includes the Alzenau dialect.

History 
In origin, Wymysorys is traced to derive from 12th century Middle High German, with a strong influence from Polish, and presumably also some influence from Low German, Dutch, Old English and perhaps Frisian. The inhabitants of Wilamowice are thought to be descendants of German, Flemish and Scottish settlers who arrived in Poland during the 13th century. Many of the inhabitants claim that they are descended from the people of Flanders, Friesland, and Holland, with others claiming to be descended from the Anglo-Saxons. Although historically derived from the German dialect continuum, Wymysorys is not mutually intelligible with Standard German. Unlike in other West Germanic enclave communities in Polish-speaking territory, where closely related dialects (e.g. Halcnovian) were spoken, Wymysorys speakers did not self-identify as Germans and used Polish, not German, as Dachsprache.

Wymysorys was the vernacular language of Wilamowice until World War II. However, it seems it has been in decline since the late 19th century. In 1880 as many as 92% of the town's inhabitants spoke Wymysorys (1,525 out of 1,662 people), in 1890 – only 72%, in 1900 – 67%, in 1910 – 73% again. Although Wymysorys was taught in local schools (under the name of "local variety of German"), since 1875 the basic language of instruction in most schools in Austro-Hungarian Galicia was Polish. During World War II and the German occupation of Poland Wymysorys was openly promoted by the Nazi administration, but after the war the tables turned: local communist authorities forbade the use of Wymysorys in any form. The widespread bilingualism of the people saved most local residents from being forcibly resettled to Germany, many of them stopped teaching their children their language or even using it in daily life. Although the ban was lifted after 1956, Wymysorys has been gradually replaced by Polish, especially amongst the younger generation. Most of the inhabitants have the same surnames (Mozler, Rozner, Figwer, Biba, Foks, Sznajder), which led to the use of nicknames (Fliöer-Fliöer, Hȧla-Mockja, i.e. Florian, son of Florian or Maciej, son of Elżbieta).

Nowadays, as part of saving the Wymysorys culture, new songs and lyrics are written in this language. The play  was written in Wymysorys, based on the prose of J. R. R. Tolkien, which was staged, among others, at the Polish Theatre in Warsaw in February 2016.

Acting on a proposal by Tymoteusz Król, the Library of Congress added the Wymysorys language to the register of languages on 18 July 2007. It was also registered in the International Organization for Standardization, where it received the wym ISO 639-3 code. In a 2009 UNESCO report Wymysorys has been reported as "severely endangered" and nearly extinct.

Members of the Wikimedia Polska association were also involved in saving this dying language. As part of the "Wilamowice" project, Wymysorys words read by Józef Gara were recorded, and the Wymysorys dictionary in Wiktionary was supplemented (in 2018, the dictionary consisted of over 7,000 words).

Revitalisation 

Some new revitalisation efforts were started in the first decade of the 21st century, led by speaker Tymoteusz Król, whose efforts include private lessons with a group of pupils as well as compiling language records, standardising written orthography and compiling the first ever dictionary of Wymysorys. Additionally, a new project called The Wymysiöeryśy Akademyj – Accademia Wilamowicziana or WA-AW was established under the "Artes Liberales" program at the University of Warsaw with the intention of creating a unified scholastic body for the study of the Wymysorys language.

Phonology

Consonants 

 Voiced stops, sibilant fricatives and affricates are regularly devoiced or voiceless in final position.
 The series of palato-alveolar  and alveolo-palatal  fricative and affricate sounds, are heard interchangeably among various speakers.
 The voiced affricates  are only heard in Polish loanwords.
 A series of flat post-alveolar sibilants and affricates , are also heard in Polish loanwords, interchangeably with alveolar-palatal sounds .
 The labial-velar approximant  is pronounced with a lesser degree of lip rounding than in English, and is more similar to the Polish pronunciation of ł .

Vowels 

 Mid central vowel sounds  are also heard close central sounds , among speakers.

Alphabet 
Wymysorys has been for centuries mostly a spoken language. It was not until the times of Florian Biesik, the first author of major literary works in the language, that a need for a separate version of a Latin alphabet arose. Biesik wrote most of his works in plain Polish alphabet, which he considered better-suited for the phonetics of his language. In recent times Józef Gara (1929–2013), another author of works in the local language, devised a distinct Wymysorys alphabet, consisting of 34 letters derived from the Latin script and mostly based on Polish as well:

Wymysorys orthography includes the digraph "AO", which is treated as a separate letter.

Example words and their relationship to other languages 
A sample of Wymysorys words with German, Dutch and English translations. Note that  is read in Wymysorys like English w (as in Polish), and  like v (as in Polish and German):

Sample texts 

Lord's Prayer in Wymysorys

Our Father; English translation

Our Father, thou (who) art in heaven,
Thy name shall be hallowed;
Thy kingdom shall come here;
Thy will shall be in heaven and on earth;
give our daily bread to us today;
and forgive us our debts/sins,
as we, too, forgive our debtors/sinners;
don't lead us to sin;
but save us from evil.
[For Thine is the kingdom and the power and the glory forever.]
Amen.

A lullaby in Wymysorys with English translation:

Sleep, my boy, soundly!
Foreign guests are coming,
Aunts and uncles are coming,
Bringing nuts and apples,
Sleep, my Johnny, soundly!

See also 

 Vilamovians
 Alzenau dialect
 Silesian German
 Masurian dialect

References

Bibliography

External links 

  Wymysiöeryś – jeszcze mowa nie zginęła (Wymysiöeryś – the language has not yet perished) at YouTube. Agencja Fotograficzna Fotorzepa. Rzeczpospolita
 The founding ceremony of the Accademia Wilamowicziana at YouTube.
 A documentary about Wymysorys and the associated revitalization efforts at YouTube.
 About the Wymysorys language in a television magazine at YouTube. 
 Omniglot page.
 Central Europe's Most Mysterious Language via Culture.pl.
  WYMYSOJER
 Revitalizing Endangered Languages – The portal is also available in Wymysorys.
  Wilamowice – przywracanie języka, przywracanie pamięci / Wilamowice – restoring the language, restoring the memory (PL). Maciej Mętrak, University of Warsaw. Warsaw (April 2016; pp. 127–134)
  Narzecze wilamowickie. (Wilhelmsauer Dialekt.
  wilamowicki czy wilamowski? – Poradnia językowa PWN (Wymysorys or Wymysorys?). , Polish Scientific Publishers PWN (13 January 2020)
Ynzer łidła – nasze pieśni (Ynzer Łidła – Our Songs). Songs, Lullabies and Counting-out Rhymes from Wilamowice

Further reading
Adam Kleczkowski, Dialekt Wilamowic w Zachodniej Galicji. Fonetyka i Fleksja, 1920 (Google Books, full text) 

High German languages
German dialects
Endangered Germanic languages
Languages of Poland
Silesian Voivodeship